Owensboro–Daviess County Airport  is a public use airport located three miles southwest of Owensboro, in Daviess County, Kentucky. The airport is owned by both the city and county. It is used for general aviation and is served by two airlines; scheduled passenger service is subsidized by the Essential Air Service program.

Federal Aviation Administration records say this airport had 23,537 passenger boardings (enplanements) in calendar year 2016. The National Plan of Integrated Airport Systems for 2017–2021 categorized it as a primary commercial service airport.

Facilities
Owensboro–Daviess County Airport covers 880 acres (356 ha) at an elevation of 407 feet (124 m). It has two runways: 18/36 is 8,000 by 150 feet (2,438 x 46 m) concrete and 6/24 is 5,000 by 100 feet (1,524 x 30 m) asphalt/concrete.

In the year ending April 30, 2018 the airport had 19,991 aircraft operations, an average of 55 per day: 76% general aviation, 13% air taxi, 10% military, and 1% commercial airline. In June 2019, 49 aircraft were based at this airport: 35 single-engine, 6 multi-engine, 7 jet and 1 ultralight.

Airlines and destinations

Passenger

History
Eastern Airlines landed at Owensboro from 1951 to 1964, and Ozark Airlines from 1955 to 1975 (including DC-9s circa 1972).

RegionsAir operating as AmericanConnection flew to St. Louis until March 2007. The next EAS contract was awarded to Big Sky Airlines (Delta Connection), with service to Cincinnati scheduled to begin in June 2007. Big Sky began service in November 2007 and abruptly ended operations in January 2008. Great Lakes Aviation was awarded a contract but ultimately cancelled. Owensboro was without scheduled air service from January 7, 2008, until August 31, 2009 when Pacific Wings operating as KentuckySkies was awarded the Essential Air Service contract offering flights to Nashville.  On June 30, 2011 Pacific Wings notified the USDOT of their intent to end service at OWB, saying that they were "unable to procure counter or gate space at Nashville International Airport on reasonable terms," and on October 20, 2011 American Airlines code-share partner Cape Air was selected to operate flights to their hub at Lambert–St. Louis International Airport with service beginning on December 5, 2011.

On February 19, 2009 Allegiant Air began flying Owensboro to Orlando Sanford International Airport; it flew to Las Vegas as well. The airline ended flights to Las Vegas on August 13, 2012, but resumed them later.

Statistics

References

Other sources

 Essential Air Service documents (Docket OST-2000-7855) from the U.S. Department of Transportation:
 Order 2005-6-14 (June 15, 2005): reselecting RegionsAir, Inc. d/b/a American Connection, formerly known as Corporate Airlines, to provide subsidized essential air service (EAS) at each of the above communities (Burlington, IA; Cape Girardeau, MO; Ft. Leonard Wood, MO; Jackson, TN; Marion/Herrin, IL; Owensboro, KY; Kirksville, MO) for a new two-year period from June 1, 2005, through May 31, 2007, for a combined annual subsidy of $7,306,249. Also by this order, the Department is terminating the show-cause proceeding tentatively terminating subsidy at Kirksville, Missouri, as RegionsAir's selected proposal is below the $200-per-passenger cap.
 Order 2007-3-5 (March 9, 2007): selecting Big Sky Transportation Co., d/b/a Big Sky Airlines, and Great Lakes Aviation, Ltd. to provide subsidized essential air service (EAS) at the above communities (Burlington, IA; Cape Girardeau, MO; Fort Leonard Wood, MO; Jackson, TN; Marion/Herrin, IL, Owensboro, KY) for the two-year period from June 1, 2007, through May 31, 2009, using 19-seat Beech 1900D turboprop aircraft as follows: Big Sky at Cape Girardeau, Jackson, and Owensboro for a combined annual subsidy of $3,247,440; and Great Lakes at Burlington, Fort Leonard Wood, and Marion/Herrin for a combined annual subsidy of $2,590,461.
 Order 2008-2-1 (February 1, 2008): selecting Great Lakes Aviation, Ltd. to provide subsidized essential air service at Cape Girardeau, Missouri and Jackson, Tennessee and Owensboro, Kentucky for the two-year period beginning when the carrier starts full EAS at all three communities.
 Order 2009-6-17 (June 22, 2009): selecting Pacific Wings, LLC to provide essential air service (EAS) at Owensboro, Kentucky, and Jackson, Tennessee, at a combined annual subsidy rate of $2,294,401 ($1,068,773 for Owensboro and $1,225,628 for Jackson), for a two-year period beginning when Pacific Wings inaugurates service.
 Order 2011-10-14 (October 20, 2011): tentatively selecting Hyannis Air Service, Inc. d/b/a Cape Air to provide subsidized essential air service (EAS) at Owensboro, Kentucky, for a four-year period. The four-year period will begin when Cape Air inaugurates full EAS and will run through the end of the 48th month thereafter. This tentative selection of Cape Air will provide Owensboro with 18 nonstop round trips per week to Lambert–St. Louis International Airport using 9-passenger Cessna 402 aircraft at an annual subsidy rate of $1,529,913.
 Order 2011-11-5 (November 3, 2011): making final the tentative findings in Order 2011-10-14.

External links
 
 Aerial image as of February 1997 from USGS The National Map
 
 

Airports in Kentucky
Essential Air Service
Owensboro, Kentucky
Buildings and structures in Daviess County, Kentucky